Brigadier J. R. K. Acquah was a Ghanaian soldier and a former Chief of Army Staff of the Ghana Army. He served as Chief of Army Staff from June 1971 to October 1971.

References

Ghanaian military personnel
Chiefs of Army Staff (Ghana)